This is a list of fast rotators—"minor planets" (which includes asteroids) that have an exceptionally short rotation period, also called "rotation rate" or "spin rate". In some cases the rotation period is not constant because the object tumbles (see List of tumblers). In this list the periods are sourced from the Light Curve Data Base (LCDB), and are given in both seconds and hours.

Most minor planets have rotation periods between 2 and 20 hours. , a group of 887 bodies – most of them are stony near-Earth asteroids with small diameters of barely 1 kilometre – have an estimated period of less than 2.2 hours. According to the Minor Planet Center, most small bodies are thought to be rubble piles – conglomerations of smaller pieces, loosely coalesced under the influence of gravity. Bodies with a period below 2.2 hours – known as the "cohesionless spin-barrier" – cannot be merely held together by self-gravity, but must be formed of a contiguous solid, as they would fly apart otherwise. Via the deduction of strength boundary limits, rotation periods give an insight into the body's internal composition, and, from its degree of fracture, its collisional history can be inferred.

Bodies with an uncertain period are displayed in dark-grey. They have an Asteroid Lightcurve Database (LCDB) quality code, U, of less than 2, which corresponds to an estimated error margin of larger than 30%. A trailing plus sign (+) or minus sign (−) indicate slightly better or worse quality, respectively, than the unsigned value. This list also includes a small group of bodies which have no provisional designation in the LCDB.

Fastest rotators

Periods 0.02–0.05 hour

Periods 0.05–0.1 hour

Periods 0.1–0.5 hour

Periods 0.5–1 hour

Periods 1–2 hours

Periods 2–2.2 hours

References

External links 
 Asteroid Lightcurve Database (LCDB), query form (info)
 Asteroids and comets rotation curves, CdR, Geneva Observatory, Raoul Behrend
 Asteroid Lightcurve Photometry Database, Brian D. Warner
 JPL Small-Body Database Browser, Jet Propulsion Laboratory
 Record spin for newfound asteroid, BBC News, May 2008

Lists of minor planets
rotators, fast